Jordan Quinn Larson (born October 16, 1986) is an American volleyball player and a three-time Olympic medalist. Larson won gold with the national team at the 2014 World Championship, the Rimini Volleyball Nations League, and the 2020 Tokyo Summer Olympics, silver at the 2012 London Summer Olympics, and bronze at the 2016 Rio Olympic Games. Her 2020 Olympics win allowed her to complete the trifecta of winning an Olympic bronze, silver, and gold medal.

Career

High school
Larson was born in Fremont, Nebraska and played high school volleyball for Logan View High School in Hooper, Nebraska.  She was named to the Super-State first team in her last three seasons. In 2003, she had 15.08 kills per game to set a Class C1 state record and led LVHS to the state finals. In 2004, as a senior, she set a C1 record with 501 kills, and Logan View made it to the Class C1 state semifinals. She was named Nebraska Gatorade High School Player of the Year.

Larson played for the Nebraska Juniors at the USA Junior Olympic Girls' Volleyball Championship in 2003, 2004, and 2005. She was an All-American selection all three years.

College
Larson started her college volleyball career at the University of Nebraska in 2005. That year, she was named the American Volleyball Coaches Association Central Region Freshman of the Year and the Big 12 Conference Freshman of the Year. She also helped the Huskers finish second in the NCAA Women's Volleyball Championship. In 2006, she led the Huskers to the national title and was named to the AVCA All-America First Team. In 2007, she made the AVCA All-America Third Team. In 2008, as a senior, she was named to the AVCA All-America First Team. She was also chosen as the Big 12 Player of the Year and the league's defensive player of the year; it was the first time that a player achieved both in the same year. Over her four-year college career, Larson had a total of 1,600 kills and 1,410 digs.

International
Larson joined the U.S. women's national team in 2009. In her first season, she averaged 2.73 points and 1.06 digs per set while starting 19 matches in the Pan American Cup, FIVB World Grand Prix, and NORCECA Continental Championship. She also played for Dynamo Kazan.

In 2010, Larson started all seven matches at the Pan American Cup, and the USA won the bronze medal. In the FIVB World Grand Prix, she started all 14 matches, and the U.S. won gold. She averaged 2.75 points and 2.73 digs per set during that tournament. She scored in double-figures in 10 matches.

The following year, Larson started 13 of 14 matches in the FIVB World Grand Prix and helped the U.S. win the event again. She averaged 3.05 points, 1.93 digs, and 2.14 kills per set. Larson averaged 3.71 points, 1.21 digs, and 2.79 kills per set when the U.S. won the NORCECA Women's Continental Championship. In the FIVB World Cup, she averaged 3.10 points and 1.70 digs per set, as the U.S. won the silver medal and also qualified for the 2012 Summer Olympics.

Larson started the first six matches of the 2012 FIVB World Grand Prix preliminary rounds; the U.S. went on to win the title. She won the silver medal with the U.S. in the Olympics.

Larson won the bronze medal and the Best Receiver award at the 2011–12 CEV Women's Champions League, after her Russian team Dynamo Kazan defeated Italian MC-Carnaghi Villa Cortese.

Larson won with the Russian club Dinamo Kazan the 2013–14 CEV Champions League held in Baku, Azerbaijan, defeating 3–0 the home owners Rabita Baku in the semifinals and 3–0 the Turkish VakıfBank İstanbul in the final. She was awarded tournament's Best Blocker.

Larson won the 2014 FIVB Club World Championship gold medal playing with the Russian club Dinamo Kazan that defeated 3–0 the Brazilian Molico Osasco in the championship match.

Larson was part of the USA national team that won the 2014 World Championship gold medal when her team defeated China 3–1 in the final match.

After joining the Turkish club Eczacibasi VitrA, Larson helped them win the 2014–15 CEV Champions League by defeating 3–0 the Italian Yamamay Busto Arsizio. She was named the Most Valuable Player for the competition. This championship qualified her club to the 2015 FIVB Club World Championship and they won again the gold medal. She was named tournament's Most Valuable Player, an award that she defined as a "great end for a perfect year". She was named 2015 USA Volleyball Indoor Female Player of the Year.

A year later, she scored the final point for her club in their semifinal match against VakıfBank İstanbul. They went on to become the first club in the world to win the FIVB World Club Championship back-to-back by defending their crown in the Philippines during the 2016 FIVB World Club Championship in Manila. She also became the first and only player to win the FIVB World Club Championship for three straight years (2014-2016). She won her second USA Volleyball Indoor Female Player of the Year for the 2016 year. She won the 2017 FIVB World Grand Champions Cup Best Outside Spiker award and the bronze medal.

Larson was invited to participate in Athletes Unlimited Volleyball USA professional league's inaugural season. Larson was named MVP and its first ever awarded volleyball champion, with 4,569 overall ranking points.

In May 2021, Larson was named to the 18-player roster for the FIVB Volleyball Nations League tournament. that was played May 25-June 24 in Rimini, Italy. It was the only major international competition before the Tokyo Olympics in July. USA won the gold medal for the third year in a row.

On June 7, 2021, US National Team head coach Karch Kiraly announced Larson would be part of the 12-player Olympic roster for the 2020 Summer Olympics in Tokyo, her third straight Olympic Games. She has discussed how this would be her last Olympics, and she became the fifth oldest volleyball player in USA history to be named to an Olympic roster.

Personal life 
Larson graduated from the University of Nebraska in 2008 with a degree in communications studies. She was married to Luke Burbach before getting divorced, and is currently married to Pepperdine Men’s volleyball head coach David Hunt. Larson and Hunt had their wedding in the LA area on August 21st, 2021.

Awards

Individual
 2011–12 CEV Champions League "Best Receiver"
 2013 NORCECA Championship "Best Server"
 2013–14 CEV Champions League "Best Blocker"
 2014–15 CEV Champions League "Most Valuable Player"
 2015 FIVB Club World Championship "Most Valuable Player"
 2017 FIVB World Grand Champions Cup "Best Outside Spiker"
 2020 Summer Olympics – "Most Valuable Player"
 2020 Summer Olympics – "Best Outside Hitter"

Clubs
 2011–12 CEV Champions League –  Bronze medal, with Dinamo Kazan
 2013–14 CEV Champions League –  Champion, with Dinamo Kazan
 2014 FIVB Club World Championship –  Champion, with Dinamo Kazan
 2014–15 CEV Champions League –  Champion, with Eczacıbaşı VitrA
 2015 FIVB Club World Championship –  Champion, with Eczacibasi VitrA
 2016 FIVB Club World Championship –  Champion, with Eczacibasi VitrA
 2016–17 CEV Champions League –  Bronze medal, with Eczacıbaşı VitrA

College
 Two-time First Team AVCA All-American (2006, 2008)
 Third Team AVCA All-American (2007)
 Two-time NCAA Championship All-Tournament Team (2006, 2008)
 Two-time NCAA Regional All-Tournament Team (2006, 2008)
 Three-time First Team AVCA All-Central Region (2006, 2007, 2008)
 2005 AVCA Central Region Freshman of the Year
 AVCA National Player of the Week (September 23, 2008)
 Three-time First Team All-Big 12 (2006, 2007, 2008)
 2008 Big 12 Player of the Year
 Two-time Big 12 Defensive Player of the Year (2006, 2008)
 2005 Big 12 Freshman of the Year
 Two-time Big 12 Player of the Week
 Three-time First Team Academic All-Big 12 (2006, 2007, 2008)

National team
 2010  Pan-American Volleyball Cup 
 2010  FIVB World Grand Prix
 2011  Pan-American Volleyball Cup 
 2011  Women's NORCECA Volleyball Continental Championship
 2011  FIVB World Grand Prix
 2011  FIVB Women's World Cup		
 2012  FIVB World Grand Prix
 2012  Summer Olympics
 2013  FIVB World Grand Champions Cup	
 2013  Women's NORCECA Volleyball Continental Championship
 2014  FIVB World Championship 	
 2015  FIVB World Grand Prix	
 2015  FIVB Women's World Cup
 2015  Women's NORCECA Volleyball Continental Championship
 2016  Women's NORCECA Olympic Qualification Tournament
 2016  FIVB World Grand Prix
 2016  Summer Olympics
 2017  FIVB World Grand Champions Cup	
 2018  FIVB Volleyball Women's Nations League
 2019  FIVB Volleyball Women's Nations League
 2019   FIVB Women's Volleyball Intercontinental Olympic Qualifications Tournament (IOQT) - Qualified
 2019  FIVB Women's World Cup
 2019  Women's NORCECA Volleyball Continental Championship
 2021  FIVB Volleyball Women's Nations League
 2020  2020 Summer Olympics

References

External links

 
 
 
 

1986 births
Living people
American women's volleyball players
American volleyball coaches
Texas Longhorns women's volleyball coaches
Olympic gold medalists for the United States in volleyball
Olympic silver medalists for the United States in volleyball
Olympic bronze medalists for the United States in volleyball
Volleyball players at the 2012 Summer Olympics
Volleyball players at the 2016 Summer Olympics
Volleyball players at the 2020 Summer Olympics
Medalists at the 2012 Summer Olympics
Medalists at the 2016 Summer Olympics
Medalists at the 2020 Summer Olympics
Nebraska Cornhuskers women's volleyball players
Eczacıbaşı volleyball players
Expatriate volleyball players in Russia
Expatriate volleyball players in Turkey
American expatriate sportspeople in Russia
American expatriate sportspeople in Turkey
People from Fremont, Nebraska
Sportspeople from Nebraska
People from Hooper, Nebraska
Outside hitters